The  Ocean City Life-Saving Station is located on the Boardwalk at the Inlet, Ocean City, Maryland, United States.  The Ocean City Life-Saving Station was built in 1891 and was originally located at Caroline Street on the boardwalk until it moved to its current location in 1977. It currently serves as the Ocean City Life-Saving Station Museum since 1978.

Ocean City Life-Saving Station Museum
The Ocean City Life-Saving Station Museum displays exhibits on storms, sea life and life-saving in Ocean City.  Other exhibits in the two-floor building include a boat room, beach vacation artifacts, commercial fishing information, the history of the pioneering women of Ocean City, over 200 samples of sand from around the world, and OC surfing.  Several tanks house local marine animals such as American eel, Horseshoe crabs and seahorses.

Footnotes

External links

Ocean City Life-Saving Station Museum (official website) 
Ocean City Life-Saving Station Museum (Ocean City Vacation and Hotels Guide website)

Museums in Worcester County, Maryland
Maritime museums in Maryland
Life-Saving Service stations
Ocean City, Maryland